Mark D. Steinberg (born June 8, 1953) is a historian, writer, and professor.  He taught at Harvard University, Yale University, and the University of Illinois, Urbana-Champaign, from which he retired in 2021. He is the author of many books and articles on Russian history. He remains active as an author and advisor.

Early life and education
He was born in San Francisco, California. He received a B.A. (1978) from the University of California, Santa Cruz, followed by M.A (1982) and Ph.D. (1987) degrees in history from the University of California, Berkeley. At Illinois, from 1996 until his retirement in 2021, he held the position of Professor, Department of History at University of Illinois. He was also Professor in the Department of Slavic Languages and Literatures there (since 2005) and the Unit for Criticism and Interpretive Theory (since 2007); from 1998 to 2004 he was Director of their Russian, East European, and Eurasian Center. From August 2006 until August 2013, he was the editor of the interdisciplinary journal Slavic Review.

Before coming to Illinois in 1996, he was an Assistant Professor of History at Harvard University from 1987 to 1989, and at Yale from 1989–1994, where he was promoted to Associate Professor (1994–96).

Specialization
Mark Steinberg specializes on the cultural, intellectual, and social history of Russia in the late nineteenth and early twentieth centuries, especially the period of the Russian Revolution. His recent and current research focuses on urban history, revolutions, emotions, religion, violence, and utopias. He is currently working on a new project on “the crooked and the straight” in urban public life in Odessa, Bombay, and New York City during the 1920s.

Publications

Books written
Mark D. Steinberg, Russian Utopia: A Century of Revolutionary Possibilities. Bloomsbury, 2021.
Mark D. Steinberg, The Russian Revolution, 1905–1921. Oxford University Press, 2017. Russian translation, 2018.
Mark D. Steinberg, Petersburg Fin de Siècle. Yale University Press, 2011.
Nicholas V. Riasanovsky and Mark D. Steinberg. A History of Russia, 8th ed.,  Oxford University Press, 2010
Mark D. Steinberg, Proletarian Imagination: Self, Modernity, and the Sacred in Russia, 1910–1925. (Cornell University Press, 2002, . Russian translation, 2022.
Mark D. Steinberg, Voices of Revolution, 1917 (in the series “Annals of Communism,”) Yale University Press, 2001 
Mark D. Steinberg and Vladimir M. Khrustalëv, The Fall of the Romanovs: Political Dreams and Personal Struggles in a Time of Revolution.  In the series Annals of Communism, Yale University Press, 1995 .
translated into Portuguese as, A queda dos Romanov : a história documentada do cativeiro e execução do último czar e sua família Rio de Janeiro: Jorge Zahar, 1996 
translated into Japanese, 1997
translated into Russian as: Skorbnyi put’ Romanovykh (1917–1918 gg): Gibel’ tsarskoi sem’i (in the series “Arkhiv noveishei istorii Rossii: Seriia ‘Publikatsii,’" ROSSPEN, Moscow, 2001)
Mark D. Steinberg, Moral Communities: The Culture of Class Relations in the Russian Printing Industry, 1867‑1907 University of California Press, 1992.

Books edited
Mark D. Steinberg and Valeria Sobol, eds., Interpreting Emotions in Russia and Eastern Europe.  Northern Illinois University Press, 2011.
Mark D. Steinberg and Catherine Wanner, eds.Religion, Morality, and Community in Post-Soviet Societies.  Woodrow Wilson Center Press and Indiana University Press,   2008 
Mark D. Steinberg and Heather J Coleman, eds. Sacred Stories: Religion and Spirituality in Modern Russia.  Indiana University Press, 2007. 
Stephen Frank and Mark D Steinberg, eds. Cultures in Flux: Lower Class Values, Practices and Resistance in Late Imperial Russia.  Princeton University Press, 1994. .

Personal life
Mark Steinberg was married from 1980 until her death in 2015 to Jane T. Hedges, who for many years was Managing Editor of Slavic Review (previously working in university book publishing as an editor). Their only child is Alexander (Sasha) Hedges Steinberg, a cartoon artist and designer, as well as a celebrated drag queen performer (under the name Sasha Velour) who won the ninth season of American drag competition RuPaul's Drag Race. In 2020, he married Daniela Steila, who teaches history of philosophy at the University of Turin in Italy.

References

External links
CV at University of Illinois
web page at University of Illinois

Historians of Russia
University of Illinois Urbana-Champaign faculty
Harvard University faculty
University of California, Berkeley alumni
Living people
1953 births